Coolidge Beach is a hamlet  in the town of Wilson in Niagara County, New York, United States. It is named for Calvin Coolidge, the 30th President of the United States.

References

Hamlets in New York (state)
Hamlets in Niagara County, New York